The 2018 Betard Scandinavian FIM Speedway Grand Prix was the sixth race of the 2018 Speedway Grand Prix season. It took place on August 11 at the G&B Arena in Målilla, Sweden.

Riders 
The Speedway Grand Prix Commission nominated Peter Ljung as the wild card, and Oliver Berntzon and Joel Kling both as Track Reserves.

Results 
The Grand Prix was won by Nicki Pedersen, who beat Matej Žagar, Fredrik Lindgren and Martin Vaculík in the final. Bartosz Zmarzlik has initially top scored in the qualifying heats, but was excluded in the semi-finals. Overall Tai Woffinden retained his world championship lead, however Lindgren cut the deficit to 17 points.

Heat details

Intermediate classification

References 

2018
Grand Prix of Scandinavia
Scandinavia
2018 in Swedish motorsport